Gunilla  Asker is SvP Marketing for ICA Sweden . In 2013, she was named one of the 125 most powerful businesswomen in Sweden.

Education 
Born Gunilla Astrid Henriette Asker in Sweden, she was an exchange student at the Norco High School, Norco, California, USA, in 1980. In 1982, she graduated from Djursholms samskola where she majored in social science. She went on to study at the Uppsala University where she got an MSc in international business administration and economics. Asker also studied French at the University of Pau and Pays de l'Adour in France and attended the Ruter Dam ("Queen of Diamonds") program for women in executive positions, as well as taking courses about  strategic development of the Internet, Disruption theory and Authentic Leadership  at the Harvard Business School.

Career 
During most of her professional life, Asker has worked in the fields of strategy, sales and marketing. She has been director at Unilever, SJ AB and Research International/Sifo. In 2005–09, she was Marketing and Sales Director for Svenska Dagbladet, and in 2009 she was appointed CEO for the newspaper. Asker has been in charge of taking the Svenska Dagbladet from a solely  printed paper to a multimedia  company that serves several digital channels as well as the printed paper. In September 2018 she was appointed SVP Marketing at ICA Sweden. In 2013, she was named one of the 125 most powerful businesswomen in Sweden by business journal Veckans Affärer.

Other board appointments 
Asker is member of the board at Knowit AB Sweden, AB Göta Kanalbolag, Tinius Thrust and Blommenholm Industrier AS Norway Sweden

References 

1962 births
21st-century Swedish businesswomen
21st-century Swedish businesspeople
Living people
Uppsala University alumni
20th-century Swedish businesswomen
20th-century Swedish businesspeople